Karen Beemon is an American molecular biologist whose research focuses primarily on viruses, RNA, and the genetic causes of cancer. She determined the size of retroviral genomes as a graduate student and subsequently helped characterize the Src oncogene of Rous sarcoma virus, the first tyrosine kinase. Her work on retroviral RNA processing has included mapping m6A modification sites in retrovirus genomes and determining a consensus sequence (RGACU). She also identified a Negative Regulator of Splicing sequence and an RNA-stability element that prevents nonsense-mediated decay of viral and cellular RNAs. Recently, Beemon identified tumor-promoting genes whose expression is altered by integration of the Avial Leukosis Virus (ALV) into the genome, such as the telomerase catalytic subunit, TERT.

Beemon is a professor in the Department of Biology at Johns Hopkins University, where she started her faculty career in 1981, after completing postdoctoral work at the Salk Institute with Tony Hunter. A native of Michigan, Beemon got her B.S. (with distinction) in 1969 from the University of Michigan, and then her Ph.D. from the University of California at Berkeley, where she worked with Peter Duesberg in collaboration with Peter Vogt.

As a faculty member and administrative leader at Johns Hopkins University, Karen Beemon has substantially contributed to progress related to undergraduate and graduate training and research, as well as to fostering diversity at Homewood Campus. She directed the CMDB graduate program (2003–2006) and was Chair of the Biology Department (2006–2009). She was the first woman Chair of any of the science departments in the Krieger School of Arts and Sciences. She subsequently chaired the Krieger School Status of Women Committee (2012–2016) and continues to serve on the Homewood Academic Council.

Beemon won the 2007 Retrovirology Prize for her research, including her discovery of the role of post-transcriptional regulation in viral oncogenesis. She also received a Faculty Research Award from the American Cancer Society and a Fogarty Senior International Fellowship, and she was named a Fellow of the American Academy of Microbiology. She has been a Senior Editor of the Journal of Virology since 2007 and has served on many study sections and review boards at the National Institutes of Health.

References

Year of birth missing (living people)
Living people
American virologists
UC Berkeley College of Letters and Science alumni
American women biologists
Johns Hopkins University faculty
University of Michigan alumni
Academic journal editors
Fellows of the American Academy of Microbiology
American women academics
21st-century American women